Norland is an unincorporated community in Dickenson County, Virginia, in the United States.

History
A post office was established at Norland in 1902, and remained in operation until it was discontinued in 1950. Norland might be short for "north land".

References

Unincorporated communities in Dickenson County, Virginia
Unincorporated communities in Virginia